The Permanent Representative of Luxembourg to NATO is the Grand Duchy of Luxembourg's foremost diplomatic representative at NATO, and head of Luxembourg's diplomatic mission to the organisation.

List of heads of mission

Permanent Representatives to NATO
 Albert Wehrer (1952–1953)
 Nicolas Hommel (1953–1959)
 Paul Reuter (1959–1967)
 Lambert Schaus (1967–1973)
 Marcel Fischbach (1973–1977)
 Pierre Wurth (1977–1984)
 Jean Wagner (1984–1986)
 Guy de Muyser (1986–1991)
 Thierry Stoll (1991–1993)
 Paul Schuller (1993–1998)
 Jean-Jacques Kasel (1998–2003)
 Joseph Weyland (2003–2005)
 Alphonse Berns (2005–2011)
 Jean-Jacques Welfring (2011–2016)
 Arlette Conzemius (September 2016–date)

References

NATO
 
Luxembourg Permanent Representatives
Luxembourg